State Road 28 is an east–west road in central Indiana in the United States that crosses the entire state from east to west, covering a distance of about  and passing about  to the north of the state capitol of Indianapolis.

Route description
The eastern terminus is at the Ohio state line where Ohio State Route 571 continues the route, near State Road 32 in the border-town of Union City. For most of its length it is an undivided two-lane road which mainly travels through flat, open farm land, avoiding the hillier and more wooded areas that begin not far to the south. It is divided for about  just west of Frankfort, where it passes the Frankfort Municipal Airport.

State Road 28 has concurrencies with four U.S. routes, as well as four other Indiana state roads; these are described below.

History 
Before 1926 the SR 28 designation was routed between Petersburg and Bloomfield, along modern SR 57. In 1926 SR 28 was moved to current routing, replacing SR 19 between US 31 and Alexandria and SR 33 from Muncie to the Ohio state line. The state road was extended west to the Illinois state line in either 1927 or 1928. Between 1931 and 1932 the section between Muncie and Ohio state line became SR 32 and SR 28 ended at SR 67, northeast of Muncie. The modern roadway east of Albany to the Ohio state line was proposed to be added to the state road system in this time frame. In 1932 SR 28 between Albany and the Ohio state line was added to the state road system. At this time the roadway from Williamsport to SR 25 and from US 52 to Albany was paved. The roadway west of Williamsport was paved in either 1934 and 1935. Between 1966 and 1967 the road between SR 25 and US 52 and from Albany to Union City was paved.

Major intersections

References

External links

028
Transportation in Warren County, Indiana
Transportation in Fountain County, Indiana
Transportation in Tippecanoe County, Indiana
Transportation in Clinton County, Indiana
Transportation in Tipton County, Indiana
Transportation in Madison County, Indiana
Transportation in Delaware County, Indiana
Transportation in Randolph County, Indiana